Ayeyarwady Region (formerly Ayeyarwady Division and Irrawaddy Division),  is a region of Myanmar, occupying the delta region of the Ayeyarwady River (Irrawaddy River). It is bordered by Bago Region to the north, Bago Region and Yangon Region to the east and the Bay of Bengal to the south and west. It is contiguous with the Rakhine State in the northwest.

The region lies between approximately latitude 15° 40' and 18° 30' north and between longitude 94° 15' and 96° 15' east. The estimated 2022 population is more than 6.5 million. According to the 2014 Burmese National Census the population of the Ayeyarwady Region was 6,184,829, making it the second most populous of Burma's states and regions after Yangon Region.

Ayeyarwady Region is flanked by the Rakhine Yoma (Arakan Mountains) range in the west.  Large areas have been cleared for paddy cultivation, leading to its preeminent position as the main rice producer in the country, a position it has retained into the 21st century.

It has also a number of lakes. Of the rivers branching out from the mighty Ayeyarwady, Ngawun, Pathein and Toe are famous.

The capital city of Ayeyarwady division is Pathein.

Chaungtha Beach and Ngwesaung Beach are popular resorts for both foreigners and the Burmese.
They are in the west of the Ayeyarwady Region, an hour from Pathein city and four hours from Yangon city by road.

Demographics 

Bamar and Karen form the majority of the population, with a small minority of  Rakhine in western coastal regions. Burmese is the lingua franca. The majority of the people are Buddhist, with small minorities of Christians, Muslims, Hindu and Baháʼís.

Religion 
According to the 2014 Myanmar Census, Buddhists make up 92.2% of Ayeyawady Region’s population, forming the largest religious community there. Minority religious communities include Christians (6.3%), Muslims (1.4%), and Hindus (0.1%) who collectively comprise the remainder of Ayeyawady Region’s population. 0.1% of the population listed no religion, other religions, or were otherwise not enumerated.

According to the State Sangha Maha Nayaka Committee’s 2016 statistics, 42,494 Buddhist monks were registered in Ayeyawady Region, comprising 7.9% of Myanmar's total Sangha membership, which includes both novice samanera and fully-ordained bhikkhu. The majority of monks belong to the Thudhamma Nikaya (80.1%), followed by Shwegyin Nikaya (8.3%), with the remainder of monks belonging to other small monastic orders. 5,520 thilashin were registered in Ayeyawady Region, comprising 9.1% of Myanmar’s total thilashin community.

Economy 

Ayeyarwady Region is heavily forested and wood products are an important component of the economy. The principal crop of Ayeyarwady Region is rice, and the division is called the “granary of Burma.”  In addition to rice, other crops include maize, sesame, groundnut, sunflower, beans, pulses, and jute. Fishery is also important; Ayeyarwady Region produces fish, prawn, fish-paste, dry fish, dry prawn, and fish sauce.

Despite the importance of agriculture to the region, landlessness is high in rural households. Most farms are small; nearly half are under 5 acres. Rice paddy agriculture is dominant during the monsoon but irrigation is limited, especially in smaller farms, during the dry season. Seeds are sourced from own reserves rather than from specialized traders. Yields from farms average 3.3 tons per hectacre, lower than other Asian countries.

Ayeyarwady Region also has considerable tourist potential. The city of Pathein has numerous historic sights and temples. Outside Pathein are the beach resorts of Chaungtha Beach and the lake resort of Inye Lake. Inye lake is also well known for fishery, as the major supplier of fresh water fish. Chaungtha is located in Pathein township. However, hotel and transportation infrastructure is still very poorly developed.

History 
The Ayeyarwady delta region was traditionally part of the Mon kingdom. This area fell under Burmese (and occasional Rakhine) rule from the 11th century AD. Its subsequent history mirrors that of the rest of lower Burma.

An ancient overland pre-Tang trade route from Sichuan (modern Yunnan Province) to Bengal passed through Ayeyarwady.

Cyclone Nargis 

Ayeyarwady Region was the site of heavy devastation when Cyclone Nargis made landfall in early May 2008. The cyclone made landfall on the town of Wagon near Haigyi Island. Labutta Township was most heavily struck with around 80,000 deaths. The cyclone's path devasted the low-lying delta regions going through south-central Ayeyarwady Region and Bogale before entering neighbouring Yangon Region. Nargis was the most expensive tropical cyclone on record in the North Indian Ocean at the time, costing $12 billion in aid.

Burma's state-controlled news media reported that Nargis left more than 66,000 people dead or missing after it struck the Irrawaddy Delta region May 2, unleashing torrential rains, 120 mph sustained winds and a  storm surge. Foreign relief officials and diplomats said the death toll could exceed 100,000 making it the worst natural disaster in the recorded history of Myanmar The final death toll was at least 146,000 with 90,000 confirmed dead and 56,000 or more missing.

Administrative divisions

Ayeyarwady Region consists of eight districts:
 Pathein District
 Kyonpyaw District
 Hinthada District
 Labutta District
 Maubin District
 Myanaung District
 Myaungmya District
 Pyapon District

Labutta District was formed in August 2008, three months after Cyclone Nargis hit the region. Kyonpyaw District and Myanaung District are the newest districts, formed in 2019 in the lead up to the 2020 Elections

Pathein is the capital city and capital. The region consists of 26 townships and 29 cities. In the townships there are 219 wards, 1912 village groups and 11651 villages.

Government

Executive
Ayeyarwady Region Government

Legislature

Judiciary
Ayeyarwady Region High Court

Transport 
Ayeyarwady Region is served by Pathein Airport.

Bridges 
Bo Myat Tun Bridge (Nyaungdon)
Daydalu Bridge (Pyapon)
Dedaye Bridge (Kungyangon Township in Yangon Region and Dedaye Township in Ayeyawady Region)
Gonnhindan Bridge
Kanyin Bridge (Mezaligone)
Khattiya Bridge (Maubin)
Kyauk Chaung Gyi Bridge (Pathein)
Kyungon Bridge
Labutta Bridge
Maubin Bridge (Maubin)
Maung Bi Wa Bridge (Pathein)
Mayan Ngu Bridge (Myaungmya)
Myaungmya Bridge (Myaungmya)
Natchaung Bridge (Bogalay)
Nga Wun Bridge (Myokwin)(Ingapu)
Ngathaingchaung Bridge
Pinlelay Bridge
Seikma Bridge (Bogalay)
Shwelaung Bridge
Thegon Bridge (Kyaunggon Township and Kangyidaunk Township)
Uto Bridge
Wakema Bridge

Education 

Educational opportunities in Myanmar are extremely limited outside the main cities of Yangon and Mandalay. According to official statistics, less than 10% of primary school students in the division reach high school.

Pathein University is the main university in the state, and until recently the only four-year university in the state. In recent years, the military government, which closed down universities and colleges in the 1990s to quell student unrest, has "upgraded" former colleges and two-year institutes. The government now requires that students attend their local universities and colleges, such as Hinthada University and Maubin University.

Health care 
The general state of health care in Myanmar is poor. The military government spends anywhere from 0.5% to 3% of the country's GDP on health care, consistently ranking among the lowest in the world. Although health care is nominally free, in reality, patients have to pay for medicine and treatment, even in public clinics and hospitals. Public hospitals lack many of the basic facilities and equipment. Moreover, the health care infrastructure outside of Yangon and Mandalay is extremely poor. For example, in 2003, Ayeyarwady Region had less than a quarter of hospital beds than Yangon Region although Ayeyarwady Region had a slightly greater population.

Localities 
 

Laabar Baari

References

External links

 
Regions of Myanmar